Zhang Zifeng (born 27 August 2001), also known as Wendy Zhang, is a Chinese actress currently attending Beijing Film Academy. She is widely considered one of the best young actors in China today.

In 2012 she won Best Newcomer at the 31st Hundred Flowers Awards, which made her the youngest ever Hundred Flowers Award winner. In 2017, she won Best Supporting Actress at the 22nd Huading Awards, also becoming its youngest ever recipient. In 2018, she received her first nomination as Best Supporting Actress at the 55th Golden Horse Film Festival and Awards.

In 2019, Zhang is regarded as one of the "New Four Dan actresses of the post-95s Generation" (Chinese: 95后四小花旦), along with Wen Qi, Zhang Xueying and Guan Xiaotong. Zhang ranked 98th on Forbes China Celebrity 100 list in 2019, and 81st in 2020.

Filmography

Film

Television series

Television show

Discography

Awards and nominations

References

External links

21st-century Chinese actresses
Actresses from Henan
2001 births
Living people
Chinese child actresses
Chinese film actresses
Chinese television actresses
People from Sanmenxia